, provisional designation , is a trans-Neptunian object from the outermost region of the Solar System, approximately  in diameter. It was discovered on 25 August 2012, by astronomers with the Pan-STARRS survey at Haleakala Observatory, Hawaii, United States. The weak dwarf planet candidate was numbered in 2017 and remains without a name.

Orbit and classification 

 orbits the Sun at a distance of 35.0–58.2 AU once every 318 years and 5 months (116,302 days; semi-major axis of 46.63 AU). Its orbit has an eccentricity of 0.25 and an inclination of 21° with respect to the ecliptic. The body's observation arc begins with its official discovery observation at Haleakala Observatory in August 2012.

Numbering and naming 

This minor planet was numbered by the Minor Planet Center on 5 October 2017 and received the number  in the minor planet catalog. As of 2018, it has not been named.

Physical characteristics 

According to American astronomer Michael Brown and the Johnston's archive,  measures 255 and 267 kilometers in diameter based on an assumed albedo of 0.08 and 0.09, respectively. On his website, Brown lists this object as a "possible" dwarf planet (200–400 km), which is the category with the lowest certainty in his 5-class taxonomic system. As of 2018, no spectral type and color indices, nor a rotational lightcurve have been obtained from spectroscopic and photometric observations. The body's color, rotation period, pole and shape remain unknown.

References

External links 
 MPEC 2016-O53 : 2014 OB394, Minor Planet Electronic Circular, 16 July 2017
 M.P.E.C. statistics for F51 – All MPECs
 List of Transneptunian Objects, Minor Planet Center
 Discovery Circumstances: Numbered Minor Planets (500001)-(505000) – Minor Planet Center
 
 

501581
501581
501581
20120825